Terpezița is a commune in Dolj County, Oltenia, Romania with a population of 1,920 people. It is composed of five villages: Căciulatu, Căruia, Floran, Lazu and Terpezița.

References

Communes in Dolj County
Localities in Oltenia